Athletique Club Capaco Beni, is a Congolese football club based in Beni, North Kivu province and currently playing in the Linafoot Ligue 2, the second level of the Congolese football.

The club was founded in 1974.

Honours
Nord-Kivu Provincial League (LIFNOKI)
 Winners (1): 2003, 2017–18

References

External links

Club profile - Soccerway.com
Club logo

Football clubs in the Democratic Republic of the Congo